On 26 March 1846, two vessels were ordered from Deptford Dockyard as Rifleman-designed gunvessels named Archer and Parthian. However, on 9 September 1846 the orders for both vessels were suspended prior to the vessels being laid down. On 25 April 1847 two vessels were ordered to the improved Rattler-type screw sloops as designed by John Edye of the Surveyor's Department from Deptford Dockyard. The first vessel, Archer may have been the change of the build from the Rifleman type to the sloop design. The second vessel, Wasp, appears to be a new vessel as the build for the Parthian remained on the books at Deptford until June 1849, when it was cancelled. Archer received the machinery from the gunvessel Rifleman, which resulted in an increase of speed over Wasp. Wasps hull was sheathed in Muntz metal to retard marine growth. Their armament would increase from 12 to 15 guns over their careers. Both vessels would participate in the Russian War of 1854–1855 (one in the Baltic Sea, the other in the Black Sea). Both would be broken by 1869.

According to Ships of the Royal Navy, by J.J. College, the original order for Parthian was cancelled in June 1849. This reference does not support the renaming of the vessel under either the Parthian or Wasp entry. British Warships in the Age of Sail (1817 – 1863), by Rif Winfield, states she was renamed to Wasp on 25 August 1847.

Archer was the second named vessel since its introduction for a 12-gun gun brig launched by Perry at Blackwall on 2 April 1801 and sold on 14 December 1815.

Wasp was the seventh named vessel since it was introduced for a 8-gun sloop launched by Portsmouth Dockyard on 4 July 1749, and sold on 4 January 1781.

Parthian was the second named vessel since it was introduced for a 16-gun brig sloop of the Cherokee class, launched by Bernard of Deptford on 13 February 1808 and wrecked off the coast of Egypt on 15 May 1828.

Construction and specifications
Their keels were laid in October 1847 (with Archer being specified as the 18th) at Deptford Dockyard, Archer was launched on 27 March 1849 with Wasp following on 28 May 1850. The maximum breadth was 33 feet 10 inches  with  reported for tonnage. Her builder's measure tonnage was 970 tons with a displacement of 1,337 tons.

The machinery was supplied by Miller, Ravenhill & Company. Both vessels would ship two rectangular fire tube boilers. Both were a single screw.

The armament for both vessels consisted of a pair of Dundas 1853 68-pounder muzzle-loading smoothbore (MLSB) of 87 hundredweight (cwt) 10-foot solid-shot gun on pivot mounts and ten Monk's ‘C’ 1839 32-pounder 42 cwt MLSB 8.5-foot solid-shot guns on broadside trucks.

Trials

Archer was completed for sea on 9 March 1850 at a cost of £41,404 (including hull of £20,785).

Wasp was completed for sea at Woolwich on 26 October 1850 at a cost of £33,521 (including hull of £21,326).

Ships

Notes

References

 Lyon Winfield, The Sail & Steam Navy List, All the Ships of the Royal Navy 1815 to 1889, by David Lyon & Rif Winfield, published by Chatham Publishing, London © 2004, 
 The Navy List, published by His Majesty's Stationery Office, London
 Winfield, British Warships in the Age of Sail (1817 – 1863), by Rif Winfield, published by Seaforth Publishing, England © 2014, e, Chapter 12 Screw Sloops, Vessels ordered or reordered as steam screw sloops (from 1845), Reynard
 Colledge, Ships of the Royal Navy, by J.J. Colledge, revised and updated by Lt Cdr Ben Warlow and Steve Bush, published by Seaforth Publishing, Barnsley, Great Britain, © 2020, e  (EPUB), Section P (Plumper, Renard, Reynard)

 Archer
Sloops of the Royal Navy
Sloop classes